David Hayden Brain (born 4 October 1964 in Salisbury, Southern Rhodesia) is a former Zimbabwean cricketer who played in 9 Tests and 23 ODIs from 1992 to 1995.

Brain's bowling helped Zimbabwe win their first-ever match in test cricket against Pakistan in 1995, ending with a bowling record of 3-50.

References

1964 births
Living people
Mashonaland cricketers
Zimbabwe Test cricketers
Zimbabwe One Day International cricketers
Zimbabwean cricketers
Cricketers from Harare
White Zimbabwean sportspeople